The 2010 Western Kentucky Hilltoppers football team represented Western Kentucky University (WKU) in the 2010 NCAA Division I FBS football season. The Hilltoppers were led by first-year head coach Willie Taggart and played their home games at Houchens Industries–L. T. Smith Stadium. They are members of the Sun Belt Conference.

The Hilltoppers would finish the season with a 2–10 record, 2–6 in Sun Belt play which placed them in last place. The 2 wins by the team marked the first and second victories as members of the Sun Belt.

Schedule

References

Western Kentucky
Western Kentucky Hilltoppers football seasons
Western Kentucky Hilltoppers football